The following is a list of events affecting Philippine television in 1975. Events listed include television show debuts, finales, cancellations, and channel launches, closures and rebrandings, as well as information about controversies and carriage disputes.

Events
 February 1 – The Intercontinental Broadcasting Corporation relaunched in the Philippines back on March 1, 1960.
 April 9 – The Philippine Basketball Association was inaugurated at Araneta Coliseum in Quezon City, with the Kanlaon Broadcasting System as its first coveror.
 October 1 – Thrilla in Manila
 December 1 – GMA Radio-Television Arts launches Kapwa Ko Mahal Ko.

Premieres

Unknown dates
 January: Student Canteen on GMA

Unknown
 Katha on GMA
 Katha-katha on GMA
 Tanghalan on GMA
 Discorama on GMA
 John Osteen on GMA
 Little House on the Prairie on GMA
 Chico and the Man on GMA
 MLB on GMA
 Spin-A-Win on KBS 9
 OK Lang on IBC 13
 Apat na Sikat on IBC 13
 Good Afternoon Po... Guguluhin Namin Kayo... Salamat Po on IBC 13
 Jesus Miracle Crusade on IBC 13
 The Wild Wild West on IBC 13
 IBCinema on IBC 13
 PPP: Piling-Piling Pelikula on IBC 13
 Tarzan on IBC 13
 Gunsmoke on IBC 13
 Lancer (season 1) on GMA
 Cade's County on GMA
 $6,000,000 Man (season 1) on KBS 9

Finales

Unknown
 Police Story on BBC 2
 Lunch Break on GMA
 Penthouse Seven on GMA
 Pamilya Bato-Balani on GMA
 Maiba Naman on GMA
 Vigilantes on IBC 13
 Dahong Ginto on IBC 13
 OK Lang on IBC 13
 Lancer (season 1) on GMA
 Cade's County on GMA
 $6,000,000 Man (season 1) on KBS 9

Births
January 16 – Anthony Taberna, TV & Radio host, Anchor
February 7 – Ian Veneracion, Filipino actor
February 11 – Lourd de Veyra, TV Host, TV5 & Vocalist of Radioactive Sago Project
March 14 – Rico Yan, Filipino actor (d. 2002)
May 20 – Miriam Quiambao, Filipina actress and first runner-up in Miss Universe 1999
August 7 – Almira Muhlach, Filipina actress
August 17 – Carmina Villarroel, Filipina actress, TV host and Former model
October 17 – Vina Morales, singer and actress
November 6 – Tisha Silang
November 30 – Diego Castro III, Filipino journalist and actor 
December 29 – William Thio, Filipino journalist and TV host

See also
1975 in television

References

 
Television in the Philippines by year
Philippine television-related lists